South Carolina State University (SCSU or SC State) is a public, historically black, land-grant university in Orangeburg, South Carolina. It is the only public, historically black land-grant institution in South Carolina, is a member-school of the Thurgood Marshall College Fund, and is accredited by the Southern Association of Colleges and Schools (SACS).

History
The university's beginnings were as the South Carolina Agricultural and Mechanical Institute in 1872 in compliance with the 1862 Land Grant Act within the institution of Claflin College—now known as Claflin University.

In 1896 the South Carolina General Assembly passed an act of separation and established a separate institution – the Colored Normal Industrial Agricultural and Mechanical College of South Carolina, its official name until 1954.

1920s–1940s
Academic programs received more attention as the student population increased, but other programs, such as the university's high school, were forced to close due to the Great Depression. The New Deal Programs were used to create, among other things, Wilkinson Hall, the university's first separate library building (now home to Admissions and Financial Aid).

1940s–1950s
After World War II, many students flocked to the college, creating a classroom shortage problem for the school. In 1947, the United States Army created an ROTC detachment, in which all male students were required to enroll until mandatory enrollment ended in 1969.

The school's name changed, as well, as the South Carolina General Assembly renamed the school South Carolina State College in 1954. Because of the "separate but equal" laws in the state, the legislature gave the college large sums of money to build new academic facilities and dormitories, some of which still stand on the campus today, including the Student Union (1954), and Turner Hall (1956). This was done in order to give black students an environment of "equal" education. Also, the legislature created a law program for the college, mainly to prevent black students from attending the law school at the then-segregated University of South Carolina. The law program folded in 1966 after the University of South Carolina integrated.

1960s–1980s

During the height of the Civil Rights Movement, many students participated in marches and rallies aimed at ending segregation. The struggle came to a climax on the night on February 8, 1968, when three students were killed and 27 others were wounded by state policemen at the height of a protest that opposed the segregation of a nearby bowling alley. The tragedy, known as the Orangeburg massacre, is commemorated by a memorial plaza near the front of the campus.

From the late-1960s to the mid-1980s, under the leadership of M. Maceo Nance, the campus experienced unprecedented growth in the form of new academic buildings, such as Nance Hall (1974) and  Belcher Hall (1986), new residence halls, such as Sojourner Truth Hall (1972), which, at 14 stories, is the tallest building in Orangeburg County, and a new library building (1968), not to mention enlargements and renovations of existing facilities. The school also opened the I.P. Stanback Museum & Planetarium, which is the only facility of its kind on a historically black university campus in the United States. After Nance's retirement in 1986, Albert Smith assumed the office of the school's president and, among other achievements, created an honors college in 1988.

1990s
During the tenure of Smith, the school also gained university status from the South Carolina General Assembly, becoming South Carolina State University in February 1992. In 1993, Barbara Hatton became the school's first female president and created many improvements for the campus, such as the 1994 renovation of Oliver C. Dawson Bulldog Stadium, constructing new suites and a larger press box, as well as increasing its capacity to 22,000. Hatton also spearheaded the creation of a plaza which resides in front of the Student Union and passes by several dorms and buildings in the central portion of the campus. Under SC State's next president, Leroy Davis, South Carolina State University celebrated its 100th anniversary in 1996, and the school constructed a Fine Arts Center in 1999, giving the Art and Music departments a new home.

2000–present
Under the leadership of Andrew Hugine Jr., the school constructed a new 771-bed residence hall (Hugine Suites), which is the largest dormitory in South Carolina. The first four buildings in Phase One opened on August 26, 2006, and the last two in the first phase opened on September 10, 2006. With the opening of the new dorms, SC State has closed the following dorms, Bethea (freshmen male), Miller (female), Bradham (female), and Manning (female) Halls. Both Bradham and Manning Halls had been used since the World War I era, Miller Hall is being closed due to fire alarm system malfunctions, and Bethea is being closed after 50 years of service due to numerous building and health problems. Bethea Hall will be torn down to make way for a new $33 million complex for the School of Engineering.

The dining halls, both Washington Dining Hall and "The Pitt", located in the Student Union, received major facelifts, and the dining hall inside Truth Hall has been renovated into a cyber cafe, Pete's Arena. The university is also working to renovate Lowman Hall, which, when refurbished, will be the new administration building. South Carolina State recently broke ground on the new James E. Clyburn University Transportation Center (UTC), which will be home to the only UTC in South Carolina, one of only three among Historically Black Colleges and Universities (HBCUs), and one of only 33 total UTCs in the nation. Currently work is being done to expand Hodge Hall. This science building will be gaining some much needed research and laboratory space.

South Carolina State hosted the first debate of the 2008 Democratic Party Presidential Candidate Debate series. This event, which took place on April 26, 2007, at the Martin Luther King Auditorium, was televised nationally on MSNBC. This debate made SC State the first Historically Black University to host a Presidential Candidate Debate on its campus.

Hugine's contract was terminated by the SC State Board of Trustees on December 11, 2007, only four days before the Fall Commencement Exercises, by a telephone conference meeting. According to the board, his reasons for dismissal were a performance review for the 2006–2007 school year and a second education review. The board decided to conduct a national search for a new president immediately. On December 13, 2007, the board selected Leonard McIntyre, the Dean of the College of Education, Humanities and Social Sciences at SC State to serve as interim president. Hugine was the fourth president to leave SC State since Nance retired in 1986.

George Cooper, formerly with the U.S. Department of Agriculture, assumed the presidency of S.C. State on July 16, 2008, and was the tenth president. The SC State Board of Trustees voted to terminate Cooper's contract on June 15, 2010. John E. Smalls, senior vice president of finance, was appointed to lead the university in the interim. President Cooper was reinstated two weeks later after a change in board membership. His predecessor, Andrew Hugine, Jr., who was also dismissed and sued the university, eventually accepting $60,000 to drop his suit for defamation and breach of contract. Hugine, now president of Alabama A&M University, sought $1-million from South Carolina State and $2-million from the trustees who voted to oust him.

Academics

Colleges, departments, and schools
College of Graduate and Professional Studies
 Department of Family & Consumer Sciences
 Department of Health Sciences
 Department of Human Services
 Department of Graduate Studies
 Department of Military Sciences
 Department of Nursing
College of Education, Humanities, and Social Sciences
 Department of Education
 Department of English and Modern Languages
 Department of Social Sciences
 Department of Visual and Performing Arts
 College of Science, Mathematics, and Engineering Technology
 Department of Biological & Physical Sciences
 Department of Civil & Mechanical Engineering Technology and Nuclear Engineering 
 Department of Industrial & Electrical Engineering Technology
 Department of Mathematics and Computer Sciences
Honors College
 School of Business
 Department of Accounting, Agribusiness, and Economics
 Department of Business Administration

Nuclear engineering program
SCSU is the only university in South Carolina and only HBCU in the nation to offer a bachelor's degree in nuclear engineering. The program is accredited by the Engineering Accreditation Commission of ABET. Currently, it operates through a strategic partnership with North Carolina State University and University of Wisconsin-Madison.

Accreditation
South Carolina State is regionally accredited by the Southern Association of Colleges and Schools (SACS).

The university was placed on probation in June 2014 for failing to meet the accreditor's standards "concerning governing board conflicts of interest and board/administration structure, as well as financial stability and controls." In June 2015, the SACS decided to allow the college to retain its accreditation, but kept them on probation for another year. In June 2016, SACSCOC decided to remove the college from probation and retain full accreditation with no sanctions.

Rankings
U.S. News & World Report currently has SC State ranked #82 in the Southern Regional Universities category, and #29 among HBCUs nationwide.

Campus

Three buildings, Lowman Hall, Hodge Hall, and Dukes Gymnasium are included in the South Carolina State College Historic District, and separately listed on the National Register of Historic Places.

The library is the Miller F. Whittaker Library.  The library was allocated $1 million from the South Carolina General Assembly in 1967 for its construction, and the library was dedicated in 1969. The library is named in honor of the university's third president. Originally two levels, a third level (the mezzanine) was added in a 1979 expansion.

Athletics

South Carolina State is a charter member of the Mid-Eastern Athletic Conference (MEAC) and participates in NCAA Division I (FCS for college football). The school sponsors basketball, soccer, volleyball, softball, cross country, track and field, and tennis for women, and basketball, tennis, track and field, cross country, and football for men. The athletic teams compete as the Bulldogs or Lady Bulldogs and the school colors are garnet and navy blue.

The school's football team has won more conference championships than any other school in the MEAC, with wins in 1974, 1975 (shared title with North Carolina A&T), 1976 (shared title with Morgan State University), 1977, 1978, 1980, 1981, 1982 (shared title with Florida A&M), 1983, 1994, 2004, when it shared the title with Hampton University, 2008, 2009, and 2010 (shared title with Bethune–Cookman and Florida A&M), 2013 (shared title with Bethune–Cookman), and 2014 (shared title with North Carolina Central University, North Carolina A&T, Morgan State, and Bethune–Cookman). The team also has four Black College Football National Championship titles, with the most recent title won in 2009.

In 1994, head coach Willie Jeffries led the team to a 10–2 record and defeated Grambling State University and coach Eddie Robinson in the Heritage Bowl by a score of 31–27, which crowned South Carolina State the 1994 Black College Football National Champions.

Student life
There are over 50 registered student organizations on campus.

Greek letter organizations

The university currently has chapters for all nine of the National Pan-Hellenic Council organizations

Other National Organizations include:

Marching band

The university's marching band is known as The Marching 101. The band are regular performers at football games throughout the southeast, nationally televised professional football games, and has performed in The Macy's Thanksgiving Day Parade and The Rose Bowl Parade. The band was organized in 1918 as a "regimental band" performing military drills as well as assisting with music in the college Sunday school and other occasions. From 1924 on, a succession of band directors influenced the growth of the band as it became part of the Department of Music program. The nickname "Marching 101" came about when the band started with 100 members and 1 majorette.  Today, the band has over 150 members and is accompanied by a majorette team named "Champagne".  In 2011,2012,2014 and 2016 the Marching 101 was voted to perform at the annual Honda Battle of the Bands held in the Georgia Dome in Atlanta.

Notable alumni

Academia and research

Business

Education

Arts and media

Politics, law, and government

Military

Sports

See also
 Orangeburg massacre

Footnotes

Further reading
 Shuler, Jack. Blood and Bone: Truth and Reconciliation in a Southern Town. Columbia, South Carolina: University of South Carolina Press, 2012. —Account of 1968 campus shooting.

External links

SCSU Athletics website

 
Historically black universities and colleges in the United States
Land-grant universities and colleges
Educational institutions established in 1896
Universities and colleges accredited by the Southern Association of Colleges and Schools
African-American history of South Carolina
Education in Orangeburg County, South Carolina
Buildings and structures in Orangeburg County, South Carolina
1896 establishments in South Carolina
Public universities and colleges in South Carolina